Little Mouse may refer to:

 A small mouse
 The Little Mouse, a Francophone fairy tale, partly similar to that of the Tooth Fairy
 "Little Mouse", a parody music video from the British TV series Look Around You
 The Vain Little Mouse, a folk tale